The Humberto Vidal explosion (sometimes also referred to as the Río Piedras explosion) was a gas explosion that occurred on November 21, 1996 at the Humberto Vidal shoe store in Río Piedras, Puerto Rico. The explosion killed 33 and wounded 69 others when the building collapsed. It is one of the deadliest disasters to have occurred on the island.

Explosion

The explosion occurred at about 8:35 a.m. on Thursday, November 21, 1996 in the middle of a bustling commercial sector of Río Piedras. The six-story building that housed the Humberto Vidal shoe store, a jewelry store, a music shop store and the head offices of Humberto Vidal was virtually destroyed; it was later demolished.

The immediate theory was that the explosion was caused by a bomb planted by clandestine paramilitaries or even arson because of previous deliberate acts. However, there was no trace of explosives, nor were there flammable materials an arsonist could have used.

United States President Bill Clinton declared Puerto Rico a disaster area, which ensured the receipt of federal aid to help the victims, including the assistance of the National Transportation Safety Board (NTSB), which launched an investigation. San Juan Gas Company, owned by Enron Corporation, denied any responsibility, claiming that the building had no gas service at the time of the explosion.

Casualties
The explosion killed 33 victims and wounded 69 others. Most of the victims were inside the building at the moment of the explosion, but others were in the streets surrounding the building. After the explosion, bodies of victims were placed on the pavement in front of the nearby La Milagrosa church, where Cardinal Luis Aponte Martínez administered last rites. "There were just parts of bodies lying in the street, torsos, bones, cars blasted against the building," Police Chief Pedro Toledo said. The owners of the shoe store claimed that they had reported a gas leak to the San Juan Gas Company several days before the explosion.

Investigation
The NTSB's investigation revealed that several persons had reported a gas leak in the building in the days leading up to the explosion, complaining about a bad smell in the store's basement. The store had no gas supply, so another nearby gas line appeared to be the culprit. It was discovered that a gas pipe carrying the heavier-than-air propane gas was broken. A few years earlier, a water main was installed below, which bent the pipe in the process. When the pipe had been installed, it was tightly bent, adding to its stress levels. The addition of the water main caused it to break.

The explosive gas reached the shop basement by migrating around and over pipes, causing the foul odor. However, gas company technicians were unable to detect the gas before the blast. Perhaps the most crucial error in detection occurred when a technician turned on his equipment while in the building rather than in fresh air as required, causing a failure to detect gas. The ignition source was found to be an air-conditioning switch with heated wiring.

The San Juan Gas Company vehemently denied responsibility and suggested that the blast could have been caused by sewer gas. However, the lighter-than-air sewer gas collects in the ceiling, while propane collects on the floor. The investigation showed that stored shoes were tossed up by the explosion, meaning that the fuel had to be at ground level. An upward-bent beam was also crucial to determining that the blast had come from below.

Aftermath
The San Juan Gas Company was sued by the victims' families and owners of the businesses affected. There were a total of 1,500 lawsuits presented. Through the process, the company admitted no wrongdoing. Of all the lawsuits, 725 were settled out of court, while 101 were ruled against the company. The remaining lawsuits were settled in 2002 for $28 million. There was also criticism of the company's training practices, which management promised to rectify.

According to a city resolution, all underground gas lines in Río Piedras were removed to avoid further tragedies. The area of the explosion now has a mural in remembrance of those who died.

Dramatization 
The disaster was examined in the "Puerto Rico Gas Explosion" episode of the documentary series Seconds From Disaster on the National Geographic Channel.

See also

List of explosions
Dupont Plaza Hotel arson, a New Year's Eve fire in Puerto Rico
2009 Cataño oil refinery fire, an oil refinery explosion and fire in Puerto Rico
Morris J. Berman oil spill, an oil spill on the north coast of Puerto Rico

Notes

References
 Seconds From Disaster: "Puerto Rico Gas Explosion" (December 13, 2005; Season 2, Episode 13).
 Blueprint for Disaster

External links

 National Transportation Safety Board (NTSB) summary report
 "Seconds from Disaster" episodes
 Minnesota Daily reports "20 killed, 80 hurt in Puerto Rico explosion"

Explosions in 1996
1996 industrial disasters
Disasters in Puerto Rico
Explosions in Puerto Rico
Río Piedras, Puerto Rico
1996 in Puerto Rico
1996 disasters in the United States
Gas explosions in the United States
November 1996 events in North America